The Cliffs Erie Railroad  was a railroad that operated from Hoyt Lakes to Taconite Harbor, Minnesota. The railroad opened in 1956 by Erie Mining Company to transport taconite from Hoyt Lakes to Taconite Harbor. In 1989, LTV Steel purchased Erie Mining and the railroad was renamed LTV Mining Railroad. The railroad closed in early 2001 when the LTV company ended the operations of the harbor. In 2002 Cleveland Cliffs bought the plant, and again renamed the railroad The Cliffs Erie Railroad (combining the names Erie Mining and Cleveland Cliffs). In 2004 Cliffs Erie hired a contractor to claim leftover chips and pellets from the mine due to the high iron prices. They used the only unsold locomotives, EMD F9s (borrowing one from Lake Superior Railroad Museum). The cleanup trains ran until 2008 when the last train ran. In 2014, the F9s were sold off. The railroad is now sitting, unlikely to ever see activity again.

Features
The railroad was the last to use F9 units in revenue service in the United States, until Indiana Boxcar Corporation purchased two F9s for use on the Vermilion Valley Railroad in western Indiana/eastern Illinois. It also had some of the last few Griswold rotating signals in full operation (now removed). It also featured a 100-foot-long trestle and the Cramer Tunnel.

Defunct Minnesota railroads
Railway companies established in 1956
Railway companies disestablished in 2008
American companies established in 1956